Pischelsdorf in der Steiermark is a former municipality in the Styrian Hills, in the district of Weiz in the Austrian state of Styria. Since the 2015 Styria municipal structural reform, it has been part of the municipality Pischelsdorf am Kulm.

References

Cities and towns in Weiz District